The AN/TPS-75 is a transportable passive electronically scanned array air search 3D radar produced in the United States. It was originally designated the TPS-43E2. Although the antenna is a radically new design from the TPS-43, the radar van itself, which houses the transmitter, receiver processors, and displays is very similar to the older TPS-43E2. It is produced in the United States originally by Westinghouse Defense and Electronic Division, which was later purchased by Northrop-Grumman.

Description 

The AN/TPS-75 is the primary transportable Aerospace Control And Warning (AC&W) radar used by the United States Air Force. The TPS-75 is capable of transmitting 5-Megawatts of power. (Although 5-Megawatts is almost never achieved; realistically it is approx 2.8 Megawatts)

This radar was developed as an upgrade of the AN/TPS-43(V), which entered US service in 1970; it incorporates new electronics and a new Ultra Low Side Lobe Antenna (ULSA). About 67 TPS-43(V) radars were upgraded to TPS-75(V) standard starting in FY88.

The entire system can be broken down and packed onto two M939 trucks for road transport and mobile air transport by planes such as the C-130 Hercules or bigger.  The entire radar system can be "torn down" and be ready for transport in just a few hours.  This varies greatly with the number of personnel, their level of training, and method of transport.  A typical convoy package would consist of one 5-ton truck pulling the radar van with the radar antenna in the bed of the truck and a support 5-ton pulling an AN/MJQ-1632 400 Hz power plant.  The support truck would hold some spare parts, fuel tank(s), camouflage netting, and other logistical items as needed.  The heat exchanger and -18 environmental control unit (ECU) are normally loaded into and transported within the radar van.

There are many add-ons for the TPS-75, one of which allows the AN/TPS-75 to be tilted back to see into the atmosphere assisting in detection of long range ballistic missiles.

Footnotes

See also

AN/TPS-43 radar
Ground Master 400
KALKAN radar
 List of military electronics of the United States

References

Notes

Sources 
 Mobile Military Radar website, Radar Description page - TPS-75 description & specifications (accessed 2015-01-06)

Further reading 
 www.radartutorial.eu Card Index of Radar Sets - Air Defense Radar – AN/TPS-75  (accessed 2015-01-06)

External links

AN/TPS-75 Radar System Description at globalsecurity.org

Military radars of the United States
Ground radars
Radars of the United States Air Force